Michele da Verona (Michele di Zenone) (1470, in Verona – 1536/1544) was an Italian painter of the Renaissance period. He is different but a near contemporary of Zenone Veronese (1484 -1542).

Biography
He was a contemporary of Paolo Moranda Cavazzola, and may have assisted him in the decorative work for San Bernardino in Verona. Inside the portal of San Stefano, Milan, is a large Crucifixion signed by him in 1500, and formerly in the Refectory of San Giorgio in Verona. The same subject, dated by him in 1505, is in Santa Maria in Vanzo, Padua. In both pictures there is an imitation of the manner of Jacopo Bellini. In the church of Santa Chiara, Verona, are frescoes representing the Eternal, with Angels, Prophets, and the four Evangelists, dated 1509. Frescoes of later dates exist in the churches of Vittoria Nuova and Sant' Anastasia; while in the church of Villa di Villa, near Este, is a Madonna and Child, between SS. John the Baptist, Lawrence, Andrew, and Peter dated 1523.

References

15th-century Italian painters
Italian male painters
16th-century Italian painters
Painters from Verona
Renaissance painters
1470 births
16th-century deaths